= Francesca Hummler =

German American visual artist

- Born: 1997 (age 28–29)
- Education: University of California, San Diego; Royal College of Art
- Occupations: Visual artist, Assistant Professor
- Employer: University of South Dakota

Francesca Hummler is a German-American visual artist working primarily with photography and video. Her work addresses family history, identity and generational trauma.

== Early life and education ==
Hummler was born in 1997 and grew up in the United States in a German immigrant family. She received a BA in Media Arts from the University of California, San Diego in 2019. In 2022, she completed an MA in Photography at the Royal College of Art in London.

== Academic career ==
Hummler is a faculty member in the Department of Art at the University of South Dakota.

== Selected awards ==
- 2021: Carte Blanche Étudiants, laureate, Paris Photo and Picto Foundation
- 2022: Talent Award, Vonovia Award for Photography
